Festus Davies is an Anglican bishop in Nigeria: he is the current Bishop of Ogori-Magongo, one of 11 dioceses within the Anglican Province of Lokoja, itself one of 14 provinces within the Church of Nigeria.

Notes

Living people
Anglican bishops of Ogori-Magongo
21st-century Anglican bishops in Nigeria
Year of birth missing (living people)